Clipper Navigation, Inc., is a subsidiary of Förde Reederei Seetouristik based in Seattle Washington, that provides multiple transportation and vacation packages—many of which are offered under the name Clipper Vacations—including hotel and tour packages in Victoria, Seattle, Vancouver, Friday Harbor, Portland, Whistler, the Canadian Rockies and Kelowna.

The company operates the Victoria Clipper high-speed passenger-only ferry service between downtown Seattle to both the Inner Harbour in downtown Victoria, and Friday Harbor on San Juan Island. The two Victoria Clipper catamarans typically complete a one-way trip in less than three hours.

History 
Clipper Navigation, Inc., was founded in 1986 with the original M/V Victoria Clipper I on the Seattle/Victoria route. The M/V Victoria Clipper II was actually two different boats that ran to the San Juan Islands. Then the M/V Victoria Clipper III (now M/V San Juan Clipper) was purchased. The service between Seattle and Friday Harbor provides orca and gray whale watching out of that port and has been in operation since 1991 daily from mid-May through September. As Clipper Navigation grew, it launched Clipper Vacations.

Clipper Vacations provides hotel and tour packages, not just in Victoria, but also in Seattle, Vancouver, Friday Harbor, Portland, Oregon, Whistler, British Columbia, the Canadian Rockies, Kelowna, and many spas and fishing resorts on Vancouver Island.

Fleet
The Clipper fleet currently consists of two high speed catamarans, the M/V Victoria Clipper V and the M/V San Juan Clipper that serve Seattle, Victoria, and Friday Harbor. The Clipper fleet is one of the fastest passenger vessels in the western hemisphere. 

Clipper Navigation was also responsible for operating the M/V Princess Marguerite III, a car ferry between Seattle and Victoria. Its operation was discontinued a decade ago due to the extremely high costs associated with the six-hour trip between ports. Currently, there is no car service between Seattle and Victoria. The primary choice for passengers with cars is either the Coho ferry out of Port Angeles or the Washington State Ferry from Anacortes, Washington to Sidney, British Columbia about 30 minutes from Victoria. Clipper Vacations can book passengers who wish to take the Coho in conjunction with a hotel stay. The Clipper also ran the  M/V Victoria Clipper I, and the M/V Victoria Clipper IV.

Current day operations

In 2016, Clipper Navigation was acquired by Förde Reederei Seetouristik (FRS) of Flensburg, Germany. FRS announced plans to expand the company's service to include routes between Victoria and Vancouver and between Florida and Cuba.

Amtrak service 

The Victoria Clipper ferry provides Amtrak Thruway Motorcoach service between Seattle,  and Victoria.

References

External links
 Official Home Page

Ferries of Washington (state)
Ferries of British Columbia
Transport in Victoria, British Columbia
Water transport in Seattle
Privately held companies based in Washington (state)
Transportation companies of the United States